Robert Talley is a former American football coach and player. He served as the head coach of Stonehill College in Easton, Massachusetts from 2007 to 2015, compiling a record of 48–46. He left that program as the school's all–time winningest coach.

He currently serves as the Director of Development for Athletics at the California State University, Chico.

Head coaching record

References

External links
 California State, Chico profile

Year of birth missing (living people)
Living people
Boston University Terriers football coaches
Boston University Terriers football players
Colby Mules football coaches
Dartmouth Big Green football coaches
San Francisco 49ers executives
Stonehill Skyhawks football coaches
UMass Minutemen football coaches